Bridge No. 1860, also known as the Samson Occom Bridge, is a fieldstone arch bridge in Montville, Connecticut, United States. Constructed by the Connecticut State Highway Department in 1936 as a Works Progress Administration project, it is located on Mohegan tribal land in an area that was once a part of Fort Shantok State Park. The bridge carries traffic from Massapeag Side Road (Special Service Road 433) over the Shantok Brook, a tributary of the Thames River. According to a 2011 Connecticut Department of Transportation report, it carries 1,100 vehicles per day. Samson Occom Bridge was listed on the National Register of Historic Places in 1993.

Design 
Officially referred to as Bridge Number 1860 in state records, the bridge is commonly known as the "Samson Occom Bridge". On the south end of the bridge is a wooden sign that commemorates the Christian missionary and educator Samson Occom, a colonial-period Mohegan from Montville, Connecticut. The sign does not actually declare it the "Samson Occom Bridge", but states without further explanation that it is the "Site of the Samson Occum Bridge". Built in 1936 by the Works Progress Administration, the bridge is constructed of medium-sized fieldstone and laid in cement mortar. Built up by "rubble construction", the structure is made of fieldstone, including the wing walls. Rising above the  roadway are the spandrels of the bridge, which form low parapets with ramped ends.

Preservation 
In May 1991, the Connecticut Historic Bridge Inventory plan outlined a plan for the preservation of the Samson Occom Bridge. It is unlikely that traffic would require replacement or modification of the bridge in the foreseeable future. According to a 2011 Connecticut Department of Transportation report, the bridge carries 1,100 vehicles per day. The biggest threat to the bridge is moisture control and the repair of eroded surfaces. Stone arch bridges rarely require structural rehabilitation, but an alternative solution to structural rehabilitation would be to use concrete slab imbedded above the arch, only requiring raising the roadway. The report stated that the "rustic quality" of the bridge is not compatible with roadways larger than two lanes, but that additional width could be facilitated without compromising its historical significance.

Importance 
The National Register of Historic Places nomination states that the Samson Occum Bridge is significant as an example of the 1930s public works programs and as an example of "the picturesque park architecture of the early 20th century." It was constructed at a time when cobblestone masonry was a popular choice for state park structures, but also after masonry was considered an obsolete building material. The bridge has added significance as an example of the work conducted by the federal Works Progress Administration.

See also
National Register of Historic Places listings in New London County, Connecticut
List of bridges on the National Register of Historic Places in Connecticut

References

Road bridges on the National Register of Historic Places in Connecticut
Bridges completed in 1936
Transportation buildings and structures in New London County, Connecticut
Montville, Connecticut
National Register of Historic Places in New London County, Connecticut
1936 establishments in Connecticut
Stone arch bridges in the United States